Valera Fratta is a comune (municipality) in the Province of Lodi in the Italian region Lombardy, located about  southeast of Milan and about  west of Lodi.

Valera Fratta borders the following municipalities: Bascapè, Torrevecchia Pia, Caselle Lurani, Marzano, Marudo, Villanterio, Torre d'Arese.

References

Cities and towns in Lombardy